Little Placentia Sound is an abandoned town in Newfoundland and Labrador that had a peak population of 47 in 1901. It is named after the body of water (sound) that encompasses the former community located within Placentia Bay on the Avalon Peninsula in the Canadian province of Newfoundland and Labrador. There was once a lead mine called Silver Cliff Mine located within the town.

During World War II the United States Navy built a naval base nearby at Argentia.

Demographics

In 1894/1897, McAlpine's released a business directory that lists the head of each household with their occupation in the town of Little Placentia Sound at that time. It is adapted below:

In 1901, the town of Little Placentia Sound had 47 residents all of the Roman Catholic faith.

See also 
Fox Harbour, Newfoundland and Labrador
Argentia
Naval Station Argentia

References 

Ghost towns in Newfoundland and Labrador